Renado Song (born 4 October 1934) is a Chinese Filipino weightlifter who represented the Republic of China (i.e. Taiwan) in the men's bantamweight event at the 1956 Summer Olympics.

References

External links
 

1934 births
Living people
Filipino male weightlifters
Taiwanese male weightlifters
Olympic weightlifters of Taiwan
Filipino people of Chinese descent
Weightlifters at the 1956 Summer Olympics
Place of birth missing (living people)